Aidan Heaney (born 9 August 1969) is an English retired football player and coach. He played in Major League Soccer (MLS) in 1996 with the New England Revolution. He had formerly played in Germany and for the Greensboro Dynamo, where he was inducted into the Hall of Fame in 2006.

Heaney was given a red card in the third minute of a match against the Colorado Rapids on 25 May 1996. This stood as the MLS record for fastest ejection from a match for almost thirteen years, until Carlos Johnson established the new mark after being expelled two minutes into a New York Red Bulls 1–0 loss to the Kansas City Wizards at CommunityAmerica Ballpark on 23 April 2009.

References

External links

Player profile at UNCW

1969 births
Living people
Charlotte 49ers men's soccer players
English footballers
English football managers
New England Revolution players
USISL players
North Carolina Fusion U23 players
Appalachian State Mountaineers men's soccer coaches
UNC Wilmington Seahawks men's soccer coaches
Major League Soccer players
Association football goalkeepers
English expatriate sportspeople in the United States
Expatriate soccer players in the United States
English expatriate footballers
Footballers from Newcastle upon Tyne
Expatriate soccer managers in the United States
English expatriate football managers